Up, Guards and at 'Em! is the third studio album by Leeds-based Indie rock band The Pigeon Detectives. It was released on 4 April 2011 by Dance to the Radio, and follows the band's 2009 album Emergency

The band released two tracks off the album, "She Wants Me" and "Done in Secret", in the build-up to the album launch, with "Done in Secret" being the first single from the album.

Recording
After the release of their second album in as many years, The Pigeon Detectives took a break from touring and recording. In the summer of 2010 however they set about recording their third album. Working with producer Justin Gerrish and recorded in New York City, the album has been described by frontman Matt Bowman as coming from a "mature" slant.

Tour
Along with the release of the album, the band announced a UK tour covering 14 venues. They were also announced on the Main Stage for Reading and Leeds Festivals in August.

Critical reception
Up, Guards and at 'Em! was met with "mixed or averages" reviews from critics. At Metacritic, which assigns a weighted average rating out of 100 to reviews from mainstream publications, this release received an average score of 51 based on 8 reviews. Aggregate website AnyDecentMusic? gave the release a 4.8 out of 10 based on a critical consensus of 14 reviews.

In a review for AllMusic, Jon O'Brien said: "Described as a rallying call to guitar bands by Bowman, Up, Guards and at 'Em isn't distinctive or original enough to inspire anyone to swap their synths for a six-string, and instead, sounds more like a final nail in the British indie coffin than the shot in the arm it needed." At NME Tim Chester explained: "Those three seconds of stuttering electronica simply take their reputation for leftfield experimentalism too far. Thankfully, such wilful pretension buggers off, and the rest is a more quality-controlled set than last time of big-chorus." Ben Weisz of MusicOMH wrote: "The latest effort is a progression, in that it's not straightforwardly another collection of variations on Take Her Back, but it's nothing spectacular either. There are one or two new ventures into the unknown, but by and large, The Pigeon Detectives haven’t made enough progression from Emergency."

Chart performance
Up, Guards and at 'Em! charted at number 30 on the UK Albums Chart.

Track listing

Personnel 

Musicians
Matt Bowman – vocals
Oliver Main – guitar
Ryan Wilson – guitar
Dave Best – bass
Jimmi Naylor – drums

Production
 Justin Gerrish – mixing, producer
 Josh Bonati − mastering
 John Davis − mastering
 Neil Comber – engineer

Charts

References

External links
 
 

2011 albums
The Pigeon Detectives albums